Scales are present on the bodies of various insects. A notable example are Lepidoptera, the insect order comprising moths and butterflies, which has scales on their wings and also on the head, parts of the thorax and abdomen as well as parts of the genitalia. The name is derived from Ancient Greek λεπίδος (scale) and πτερόν (wing).

The Trichoptera (caddisflies) which are a sister group of the Lepidoptera have scales, but also possess caudal cerci on the abdomen, a feature absent in the Lepidoptera. Beetles of family Dermestidae also commonly have scales.

Morphology 

The morphology of scales has been studied by Downey & Allyn (1975) and scales have been classified into three groups, namely:

 Hair-like or piliform.
 Blade-like or lamellar.
 Other variable forms.

Primitive moths (non-Glossata and Eriocranidae) have 'solid' scales which are imperforate, i.e., they lack a lumen.

As per Scoble (2005):

Structure 

Though there is great diversity in scale form, they are structured similarly. The body or 'blade' of a typical scale consists of an upper and lower lamina. The surface of the lower lamina is smooth whereas the structure of the upper lamina is structured and intricate. Scales are attached to the substrate by a stalk or 'pedicel'. The scales cling somewhat loosely to the wing and come off easily without harming the butterfly.

Colour 

The colouration of butterfly wings is created by the scales which are pigmented with melanins that give them blacks and browns, but blues, greens, reds and iridescence are usually created not by pigments but the microstructure of the scales. This structural coloration is the result of coherent scattering of light by the photonic crystal nature of the scales.

Function 

Scales play an important part in the natural history of Lepidoptera. Scales enable development of vivid or indistinct patterns which help the organism protect itself by concealment and camouflage, mimicry and warning. Besides providing insulation, dark patterns on wings provided by dark colour scales would allow sunlight to be absorbed and thus probably have a role to play in thermoregulation. Bright and distinctive colour patterns in butterflies which are distasteful to predators help communicate their aposematism (toxicity or inedibility) thus preventing a predator from preying on it. In Batesian mimicry, wing colour patterns help edible Lepidopterans mimic inedible models while in Müllerian mimicry inedible butterflies resemble each other to reduce the numbers of individuals sampled by predators.

Scales possibly evolved initially for providing insulation. Scales on the thorax and other parts of the body probably contribute to maintaining the high body temperatures required during flight. The 'solid' scales of basal moths are however not as efficient as those of their more advanced relatives as the presence of a lumen adds air layers and increases the insulation value.

Young adults of myrmecophilous Lepidoptera escape from ant's nests by virtue of the deciduous waxy scales with which they are covered when born. These scales rub off and stick on the ants as they make their way out of the nest after hatching.

Scales greatly reduce fatalities among Lepidoptera after flying into spiderwebs. The detachable scales pull away freely and enable the insect to escape. (Forsyth 1992:12) Thomas Eisner tested spiderwebs' effectiveness by dropping various insects onto the webs. Moths were consistently able to escape, and all left impact spots where scales had stuck to the web. Eisner found these spots to be common. (Eisner 2003:218-220)

Scales also help increase the lift to drag ratio in gliding flight.

Successive close-ups of the scales of a Peacock wing

See also 

 Scale (zoology)
 External morphology of Lepidoptera

References 

Lepidopterology
Insect anatomy